Asota albiformis  is a moth of the family Erebidae first described by Charles Swinhoe in 1892. It is found in Borneo, the Philippines, Sulawesi and the Moluccas.

The wingspan is about 56 mm.

Subspecies
Asota albiformis albiformis (Indonesia, Malaysia, Philippines)
Asota albiformis ternatensis (Indonesia)

References
Zwier, Jaap "Asota albiformis albiformis Swinhoe, 1892". Aganainae (Snouted Tigers).

Asota (moth)
Moths of Asia
Moths described in 1892